O. R. Melling, born G. V. Whelan, is an author of several fantasy novels. Melling's novels are read by both adults and young adults and contain stories mostly written around Irish and Celtic folklore, faeries in particular.

Melling was born in Ireland and was brought up in Toronto, Ontario with seven sisters and two brothers. She attended Loretto College School.

With a B.A. in philosophy and Celtic Studies from Trinity College in the University of Toronto and an M.A. in Mediaeval History, Melling has written film scripts and papers and is a literary critic under her actual name, G. V. Whelan.

Currently living in her hometown of Bray, County Wicklow, Melling is still writing and has a daughter.

Books
 The Chronicles of Faerie series 
 The Hunter's Moon (1993)
 The Summer King (Amulet, 2006)
 The Light-Bearer's Daughter (Amulet, 2007)
 The Book of Dreams (Amulet, 2009)
 The Chronicles of Faerie, 2002 omnibus edition (3 vols.)
 The Golden Book of Faerie, 2004 omnibus edition (4 vols.)

 The Singing Stone (1986)
 The Druid's Tune (1983)
 My Blue Country (Toronto: Viking, 1996), 
 Falling Out of Time  (1989)
 People of the Great Journey: would you go if you were called?,

References

External links

 
 Biography at Mythic Imagination Institute (mythicjourneys.org)
 
 

Canadian fantasy writers
Canadian women novelists
Trinity College (Canada) alumni
University of Toronto alumni
People from Bray, County Wicklow
Women science fiction and fantasy writers
Living people
Year of birth missing (living people)